Boneh-ye Mirza (also Romanized as Boneh-ye Mīrzā) is a village in Shahi Rural District, Sardasht District, Dezful County, Khuzestan Province, Iran. At the 2006 census, its population was 36, in 7 families.

References 

Populated places in Dezful County